Governor Dewey may refer to:

Nelson Dewey (1813–1889), 1st Governor of Wisconsin
Thomas E. Dewey (1902–1971), 47th Governor of New York